In the United States, a goon squad is a group of criminals or mercenaries commonly associated with either pro-union violence or anti-union violence though they may be employed in other situations as well. In the case of pro-union violence, a goon squad may be formed by union leaders to intimidate or assault non-union workers, strikebreakers, or parties who do not cooperate with the directives of union leadership. In the case of anti-union violence, goon squads are traditionally hired by employers as an attempt at union busting, and resort to many of the same tactics, including intimidation, espionage, and assault. 

During the labor unrest of the late 19th century in the United States, businessmen hired goon squads composed of Pinkerton agents to infiltrate unions, and as guards to keep strikers and suspected unionists out of factories. One of the best known such confrontations was the Homestead Strike of 1892, in which Pinkerton agents were called in to enforce the strikebreaking measures of Henry Clay Frick, acting on behalf of Andrew Carnegie, who was abroad; the ensuing conflicts between Pinkerton agents and striking workers led to several deaths on both sides. The Pinkertons were also used as guards in coal, iron, and lumber disputes in Illinois, Michigan, New York and Pennsylvania, as well as the Great Railroad Strike of 1877.

In some cases, corporations have been formed specifically to provide the services of goon squads. The Corporations Auxiliary Company was a corporation created to conduct "the administration of industrial espionage", providing goon squads and labor spies in exchange for payment. In 1921 the Corporations Auxiliary Company was known to masquerade under a dozen different names, and specialized at electing its agents to union office in order to control or destroy unions.

In a example of goon squad activity outside the US, during the 2019–2020 Hong Kong protests, an armed mob of suspected triad members dressed in white indiscriminately attacked civilians on Hong Kong streets with steel rods and rattan canes, before attacking members of the public in nearby Yuen Long station including the elderly, children, protesters returning from a demonstration in Sheung Wan on Hong Kong Island, journalists and lawmakers, which is commonly known as the 2019 Yuen Long attack, or the 721 incident. Pro-democratic activists accused Pro-Beijing advocates and police of colluding with of the attackers, pointing to the slow-response time and uncharacteristically disinterested demeanor of the police and a Pro-Beijing politician and member of the Legislative Council, Junius Ho who greeted a group of armed white-clothed men, shaking their hands and calling them "heroes", giving them thumbs-up and saying to them "thank you for your hard work." At least one of the white-clothed men who shook hands with Ho has been shown to have been inside Yuen Long station during the attacks.

Etymology
The term "goon" was reputedly coined by F. L. Allen in 1921, perhaps a variant of the US slang "gooney" which had been around since at least 1872, meaning a simpleton or fool, which may have derived from "gony", applied by sailors to the albatross and similar big, clumsy birds (c.1839). In the late 1930s, E. C. Segar’s comic strip Popeye had a character named "Alice the Goon". It was from this character that large stupid people or stupid things came to popularly be called "goons" and the term entered into general use.  "Goon" evolved into slang for a thug (1938), someone hired by racketeers to terrorize political or industrial opponents (1938), or a German stalag guard for American POWs (1945).

See also
 Guardians of the Oglala Nation (GOONs) – Lakota paramilitary force
 Labor spies
 Union busting
 Union violence

References 

Labor-related violence in the United States
Labor disputes in the United States
American mercenaries